Armir or ARMIR may refer to:

People
 Armir Grimaj, Albanian football player

ARMIR
 Armata Italiana in Russia, an army-sized unit of the Italian Royal Army (Regio Esercito Italiano), during World War II